American poet Jesse Ball's first book was 105 pages long and called March Book. It was critically acclaimed and it helped to build the foundation for Ball's subsequent reputation as a poet. The book was published in spring of 2004 by Grove Press.

Eamon Grennan, Irish master-poet, wrote of March Book:
Various in subject matter, consistent in their control of voice, at home in memory, fable, parable, the poems in March Book add up to a mature, surprising and  extraordinarily lively first collection.  Jesse Ball's imagination is at once mordant and playful, inhabiting and populating its world with a mixture of enigmatic observation and direct speech.  He stands where the true poet should, in his properly vulnerable position, his motto:  we are near a truth and daren't speak.  Like a fractured prism, his poems dissolve the self into other voices and remote situations, each one a glittering shard of some unspoken truth that offers itself resolute outside the haze of his own life.  There is, however, nothing hazy about the work, informed as it is by a verbally honed, sharply pointed steadiness of purpose.  'In these unruly days,' he says in one poem, 'even prayer may be true.' Combating unruliness with their curious mixture of surprise and formal grace, the poems of March Book insist on their own kind of truth, and are their own kind of oddly angled prayer.

External links
 Official website of Jesse Ball
 Claire Nicholas White's review (PDF)
 DeSales Harrison's review in Boston Review

American poetry collections